Frank Peters (November 1894 – death date unknown) was an American Negro league shortstop in the 1910s.

A native of Chicago, Illinois, Peters was the son of fellow Negro leaguer W. S. Peters. He played for the Leland Giants between 1914 and 1917.

References

External links
 and Seamheads

1894 births
Date of birth missing
Year of death missing
Place of death missing
Leland Giants players